"Wow" is a song by the English musician Kate Bush. Originally released on her second album Lionheart in 1978, it was issued as the album's second single in March 1979. The song became a top 20 hit in the UK and in Ireland.

"'Wow' is about the music business," she told her KBC fan club magazine in 1979. "Not just rock music but show business in general. It was sparked off when I sat down to try to write a Pink Floyd song – something spacey."

Overview 
The single version is an edited version of "Wow", although it is not labelled as such on most editions. On all European "Wow" singles, the first 12 seconds of synthesiser chords have been removed. Brazil and Canada used the full-length LP version. The Canadian single featured a unique sleeve and was pressed on transparent yellow vinyl. The song was a moderate hit on Canada's Adult Contemporary singles chart in RPM Magazine.

The song was released in the UK on 9 March 1979 and peaked at number 14 in the UK Singles Chart, remaining on the chart for ten weeks. This was an improvement on Bush's previous single, "Hammer Horror" which had stalled at No.44 a few months earlier. She also made a guest appearance on the TV Special ABBA in Switzerland, where she performed this song in April 1979. Also around the time of this release, Bush embarked on her first of only two live concert tours. Due to this and the release of the single, Bush's second album Lionheart saw a resurgence of interest in the UK albums chart, by making a re-entry into the top twenty for several weeks. The song became a hit in other countries such as Ireland where it reached No.17. "Wow" was a target for comedian Faith Brown who parodied it on her show. In 2012 The Guardian called "Wow" the "undisputed highlight" of the Lionheart album.

Release
"Wow" was released on 5 March 1979.

"Wow" also appears on Bush's compilation hits album The Whole Story, released in 1986. For the video compilation of this album, a new video was made of "Wow", featuring a montage of Bush performing live in concert.

This song was featured in the 2002 Rockstar North video game Grand Theft Auto: Vice City as part of the power ballads radio station Emotion 98.3. However, it was not featured on the 10th anniversary edition re-release.

Music video
A video was filmed for the release, featuring Bush performing the song in a darkened studio, and then backed by spotlights during the chorus.

The video for "Wow" was censored by the BBC because the song was considered risqué. The video shows Bush patting her bottom while singing "he's too busy hitting the Vaseline". Vaseline was once defined as a personal sexual lubricant.

Track listing
All tracks written and composed by Kate Bush.

7-inch vinyl
 "Wow" (edited version) – 3:46
 "Fullhouse" – 3:13

Personnel

Musicians
Charlie Morgan – drums ("Wow")
Stuart Elliot – drums ("Fullhouse")
Brian Bath – guitar ("Wow")
Del Palmer – bass ("Wow")
David Paton – bass ("Fullhouse")
Ian Bairnson – electric guitar
Paddy Bush – mandolin ("Wow")
Kate Bush – vocals, harmony vocals, piano
Duncan Mackay – synthesizer ("Wow")
Francis Monkman – Hammond organ ("Fullhouse")

Production
Andrew Powell – producer
Kate Bush – assistant producer
Patrick Jaunead – assistant engineer
David Katz – orchestra contractor
Jon Kelly – recording engineer
Nigel Walker – assistant engineer, mixing, mixing assistant

Charts

Cover versions
 Jazz singer Liza Lee covered the song on her 2009 album Anima. Lee donated proceeds of the album to the Society for Women's Health Research.

References

Kate Bush songs
1979 singles
Songs written by Kate Bush
1978 songs
EMI Records singles
Song recordings produced by Andrew Powell
Songs about actors
1970s ballads
Rock ballads